Dobří holubi se vracejí is a Czech dark comedy from the Alcohol Treatment Centre. It was directed by Dušan Klein, released in 1987.

Cast
 Milan Kňažko - Miloš Lexa
 Rudolf Hrušínský - Masák
 Alicja Jachiewicz - Soňa Landová
 Vladimír Menšík - Honzíček
 Pavel Zedníček - Mutzlinger
 Jiří Hálek - Čtvrtečka
 Marián Labuda - Dorenda
 Zdeněk Řehoř - Zlámal
 Radan Rusev - Janošík
 Rudolf Hrušínský ml. - Obuli
 Jan Přeučil - Doctor Vonka
 Josef Somr - senior doctor Dorotka
 Evelyna Steimarová - Irena
 Petr Čepek - Uncle Karel
 Oldřich Navrátil - Doctor Křížek
 Josef Somr - Dobrotka
 Eva Vejmělková

External links
 

1987 films
Czech black comedy films
1980s Czech-language films
1980s black comedy films
1987 comedy films
1980s Czech films